Alfred "Al" Jones (born October 1, 1946 in Detroit, Michigan), nicknamed "Tiger Cat", is a former professional boxer.

Amateur career 
Jones won the National Golden Gloves Middleweight Championship in 1965 with a win over Dave Matthews of Buffalo, NY.

Jones went on to win the bronze medal in the 1968 Summer Olympics at 165 pounds.

Jones chipped Steve Henderson's tooth in a 1968 barracks fight at Ft. Devens, MA

1968 Olympic results
Below are the results of Alfred Jones, an American middleweight boxer who competed at the 1968 Mexico City Olympics:
 
 Round of 32: Defeated Marcelo Quinones (Peru) by decision, 5-0
 Round of 16:  Defeated Raúl Marrero (Cuba) by decision, 5-0
 Quarterfinals:  Defeated Simon Georgiev (Bulgaria) by decision, 4-1
 Semifinals:  Lost to Chris Finnegan (Great Britain) by decision, 1-4.  

Jones was awarded the bronze medal in 1970 following a decision by AIBA and the IOC to recognize losing semifinalists.

Pro career
Jones turned pro in 1969 and won his first 12 fights. He would retire after losing in 1971 by KO to Dave Thach.

References

External links
 

1946 births
Living people
Boxers from Detroit
Light-heavyweight boxers
Middleweight boxers
Boxers at the 1968 Summer Olympics
Olympic bronze medalists for the United States in boxing
Winners of the United States Championship for amateur boxers
Medalists at the 1968 Summer Olympics
American male boxers